The second HMS Mounsey (K569) was a British Captain-class frigate of the Royal Navy in commission during World War II. Originally constructed as the United States Navy Evarts-class destroyer escort DE-524, she served in the Royal Navy from 1943 to 1946.

Construction and transfer
The ship was laid down as the unnamed U.S. Navy destroyer escort DE-524 by the Boston Navy Yard in Boston, Massachusetts, on 14 August 1943 and launched on 24 September 1943. The United States transferred the ship to the United Kingdom under Lend-Lease on 23 December 1943.

Service history
The ship was commissioned into service in the Royal Navy as HMS Mounsey (K569) on 24 December 1943, the day after her transfer. She served on escort duty, protecting convoys in the North Atlantic Ocean as well as Arctic convoys carrying equipment and supplies to the Soviet Union. She also operated in support of the Allied invasion of Normandy in the summer of 1944.

On 2 November 1944, Mounsey was escorting Convoy RA 61 in the Barents Sea outbound from the Soviet Union when the German submarine U-295 damaged her with a G7es – known to the Allies as "GNAT" – acoustic torpedo, forcing her to return to the Kola Inlet for temporary repairs.  Once those repairs were complete, she departed the Soviet Union with Convoy RA 62 and returned to the United Kingdom for permanent repairs, after which she returned to service.

At 2300 hours on 10 May 1945, just after the end of World War II, Mounsey accepted the surrender of the German submarine U-1023, which held the distinction of being the last German submarine to sink an Allied warship during the war, off Land's End. The submarine later made a well-publicised tour of British ports.

Early in 1946, Mounsey steamed to the United States, arriving at the Philadelphia Naval Shipyard in Philadelphia, Pennsylvania, on 7 February 1946. The Royal Navy returned her to the U.S. Navy there on either 25 or 27 February 1946 (sources vary).

Disposal
Mounsey officially was declared not essential to the defense of the United States on 6 March 1946, and the U.S. Navy struck her from its Naval Vessel Register on 28 March 1946. She was sold to the North American Smelting Company of Philadelphia on 8 November 1948 for scrapping, which was completed on 9 November 1948.

References

Navsource Online: Destroyer Escort Photo Archive DE-278 HMS Mounsey (K-569)
uboat.net HMS Mounsey (K 569)
uboat.net Ships hit by U-boats: HMS Mounsey (K 569)
Captain Class Frigate Association HMS Mounsey K569 (DE 524)

External links
 Photo gallery of HMS Mounsey (K569)

 

Captain-class frigates
Evarts-class destroyer escorts
World War II frigates of the United Kingdom
World War II frigates and destroyer escorts of the United States
Ships built in Boston
1943 ships